Change 2011 is a Finnish political party founded in 2009. The chairman of the party is Anita Saarinen. The party's name refers to 2011 Finnish parliamentary election, the first election the party participated in. The party's main goals are direct democracy, freedom of speech, and the interest of the citizens of Finland. The party also wants to "rationalize" immigration politics, and have "just sentences" given for violent and sexual crimes.

On 4 June 2010, the party announced that it had succeeded to gather the 5,000  required in order to become officially registered. On 8 October 2010, it became a registered political party.

In the Finnish parliamentary election of 2011, Change 2011 got 0.26% (7,504) of total votes. None of the party's candidates were elected to the parliament, but in October 2013 James Hirvisaari became the party's first MP, when he joined the party having been expelled from the Finns Party. In the Finnish parliamentary election in 2015, the party got 7,434 or 0.3% of total votes, and was left without seats in the parliament.

After the 2015 parliamentary election, Change 2011 was stricken from the register, as it had failed to win a single seat in two consecutive parliamentary elections.

Election results

Leaders

Leaders
 Juha Mäki-Ketelä (2009–2010)
 Jiri Keronen (2010–2011)
 Marjukka Kaakkola (2012–2013)
 Jari Leino (2014–2015)
 Jari Väli-Klemelä (2015–2016)
 Anita Saarinen (2016–)

Vice-leaders
 Jiri Keronen (2009–2010)
 Teemu Lavikka (2010–2011)
 Timo Röyhkiö (2012)
 Timo Hellman (2012)
 Jorma Piironen (2013)
 Helena Eronen (the 1st) (2014–2015)
 Kyuu Eturautti (the 2nd) (2014–2015)
 Kyuu Eturautti (the 1st) (2015)
 Laura Lehtinen (the 2nd) (2015)
 Laura Lehtinen (the 1st) (2016)
 Kim Ahonen (the 1st) (2017–)

References

External links
 

Non-registered political parties in Finland
Direct democracy parties
Political parties established in 2009
2009 establishments in Finland